Blues Bag, subtitled Leonard Feather's Encyclopedia Of Jazz - Jazz Of The '60s, Vol. 2,  is an album by clarinetist Buddy DeFranco recorded in Los Angeles in late 1964 and released by the Vee-Jay label the following year.

Critical reception

AllMusic reviewer Scott Yanow stated "The seven selections are all bluish with many of them actually being blues. ... This is intriguing music which makes one wish that Buddy DeFranco still played bass clarinet now and then".

Track listing
 "Blues Bag" (Buddy DeFranco) – 5:30
 "Rain Dance" (Victor Feldman) – 5:37
 "Straight, No Chaser" (Thelonious Monk) – 3:44
 "Cousin Mary" (John Coltrane) – 4:40
 "Blues Connotation" (Ornette Coleman) – 3:44
 "Kush" (Dizzy Gillespie) – 7:48
 "Twelve Tone Blues" (Leonard Feather) – 6:20

Personnel
Buddy DeFranco – clarinet, bass clarinet 
Freddy Hill (track 5), Lee Morgan (tracks 2 & 7) – trumpet
Curtis Fuller – trombone (tracks 2, 5 & 7)
Victor Feldman – piano, vibraphone
Victor Sproles – bass
Art Blakey – drums

References

1965 albums
Buddy DeFranco albums
Vee-Jay Records albums